Scheveningse Voetbal Vereniging Scheveningen is an association football club from Scheveningen, a district of The Hague, Netherlands. The club was founded 1 July 1919. It is currently playing in the Tweede Divisie, the third tier of football in the Netherlands.

They play at the Houtrust Scheveningen.

History
Between 1954 and 1971 the club played professional football under the names SHS and Holland Sport.

The club was selected by the French sports newspaper L'Équipe to participate in 1955–56 European Cup, but declined to do so.

The biggest success in the club's history was the overall amateur title in 1996. Martin Jol was the team manager at that time.

Current squad

References

External links
 Official site 

 
Football clubs in the Netherlands
Football clubs in The Hague
Association football clubs established in 1919
1919 establishments in the Netherlands